USS Chatterer (AMc-16) was a Chatterer-class coastal minesweeper acquired by the U.S. Navy.

The first ship to be named Chatterer by the Navy, AMc-16, formerly Sea Breeze, was acquired by the Navy and placed in service on 20 November 1940.

World War II service 

Following conversion she was assigned to the Western Sea Frontier Force and later to the 12th Naval District.

Post-war deactivation 

Placed out of service on 12 September 1944, she was stricken from the Navy Register on 14 October of that year.

References

External links 
 NavSource Online: Mine Warfare Vessel Photo Archive - Chatterer (AMc 16)

Minesweepers of the United States Navy
World War II minesweepers of the United States